The 1978 Fuji Long Distance Series was the second season of this series, with all races being held at the Fuji International Speedway.

It was contested by Group 6 sportscars (class R2), Group 5 silhouettes (class R1) and touring cars (classes 1, 2 and 3).

Schedule

Season results

Final standings

References

Fuji Long Distance Series seasons